Cherokee Falls is a waterfall located in Cloudland Canyon State Park in Dade County, Georgia. The waterfall, formerly unnamed, was named in a contest.

See also
Hemlock Falls
Cloudland Canyon State Park

References

Waterfalls of Georgia (U.S. state)
Lookout Mountain
Landforms of Dade County, Georgia